Summit Middle School may refer to:

 Summit Middle Charter School (Boulder, Colorado)
 Summit Middle School (Coquitlam) (British Columbia)
 Summit Middle School, which is part of Summit Public Schools (New Jersey)
 Summit Middle School (Edmond), which is part of Edmond Public Schools (Oklahoma)